Guillermo Durán and Nicolás Mejía were the defending champions but chose not to defend their title.

Franco Agamenone and Hernán Casanova won the title after defeating Karol Drzewiecki and Jakub Paul 6–3, 6–4 in the final.

Seeds

Draw

References

External links
 Main draw

Challenger Coquimbo II - Doubles
2022 Doubles 2